Ladies of the Canyon is a Canadian band from Montreal, Quebec composed of Tara Martin, Maia Davies, Jasmine Bleile and Anna Ruddick. Their sound encompasses a melding of influences, such as roots, rock, country, and Americana.  The group has released two albums.

History
Founded in 2005, Ladies of the Canyon began their career playing small venues in Montreal’s popular Mile-End neighbourhood. At the time their music consisted mainly of "countrified" 1970s Californian soft-rock sound; over time their musical style expanded to include classic folk and contemporary rock.

The group released their first studio album, Haunted Woman, in 2010 through Kindling/Warner Music Canada. In the three years following this release, Ladies of the Canyon appeared on stage with  Broken Social Scene and The Dears, were nominated for a Canadian Country Music Association award. The band worked with producer Mark Howard to record their second album, Diamond Heart.  In 2012, during the recording of this album, Sargeant was replaced by drummer Tara Martin.  Diamond Heart was released in September, 2013.

In 2014 the Ladies of the Canyon toured with the Barenaked Ladies.

Solo careers
Maia Davies has launched a solo career by releasing her debut French language album, Héritage, using her mononym Maia (now known as Maia Lily) (stylized as Maïa Lily).

Jasmine Bleile released her first solo album under the name: Satellītes on November 17, 2018. https://satellitesofmontreal.com

Discography

Studio albums

Singles

Music videos

Awards and nominations

References

External links

Ladies of the Canyon at CMT

Musical groups established in 2006
Musical groups from Montreal
Canadian country music groups
2006 establishments in Quebec